Stantor may refer to:

Stantors of Horningsham, England
Peter Stantor (died 1415), English politician, member of the Parliament of England

See also
Stanton (surname)